The Masters Pro  was a tournament open to men's tennis professionals. It was held between 1956 and 1959 and again between 1964 and 1965. The Ampol Masters at White City, Sydney was held in 1958. The tournament was played in a round robin format  instead of the usual knockout competition on each of the six occasions that it was played in Los Angeles, and a knockout format when played at Sydney in 1958.  At the 1964 and 1965 editions the round robin stage was followed by a semifinal and final round. The event was played on hard cement tennis court's at the L.A. Tennis Club, and on grass in 1958 at White City, Sydney.

Finals

Singles

See also
Major professional tennis tournaments before the Open Era

References

Tennis tournaments in California
Hard court tennis tournaments
Tennis in Los Angeles
Defunct tennis tournaments in the United States
Professional tennis tournaments before the Open Era